FiftyFifty Brewing Co. is a brewpub in Truckee, California. Known for their barrel-aged beers, their production surpassed one thousand barrels of aged beer along with a further volume of fresh beer in 2012.

Beer 
Totality Imperial Stout is an imperial stout produced regularly by the company. Yearly, some of this beer is set down in a variety of barrels for six months of aging to make Eclipse Barrel Aged Imperial Stout. Barrels include those previously used for aging brandy, Buffalo Trace Whiskey, and Four Roses Single Barrel among others; there are eleven barrel-types used in all. Bottles are then sold direct from the brewery on futures contract several months before the year's release. Bottles not sold in futures are sent out for distribution or served on premises.

Awards

See also 
 List of breweries in California

References

External links 
 

Beer brewing companies based in California
Companies based in Nevada County, California
American companies established in 2011
Food and drink companies established in 2011
2011 establishments in California